Češnjevek is a village in the Municipality of Cerklje na Gorenjskem in the Upper Carniola region of Slovenia.

The local church is dedicated to the Holy Spirit.

References

External links 

Češnjevek on Geopedia

Populated places in the Municipality of Cerklje na Gorenjskem